Philip Donato (born 1972) is an Australian politician. He was a Shooters, Fishers and Farmers Party member of the New South Wales Legislative Assembly from November 2016 to December 2022, and subsequently an independent, representing the electorate of Orange.) Donato was a police officer and prosecutor before entering politics, and was elected at a by-election following the resignation of National Party MP Andrew Gee.

He is the first member of the Shooters, Fishers and Farmers Party to represent a lower house seat, joining Legislative Council members Robert Borsak and Robert Brown in the Parliament of New South Wales.

On 12 December 2022, Donato resigned from the Shooters, Fishers and Farmers Party following a dispute with the party's leadership, and announced he will contest the 2023 New South Wales state election as an Independent.

References

 

1972 births
Living people
Shooters, Fishers and Farmers Party politicians
Independent members of the Parliament of New South Wales
Members of the New South Wales Legislative Assembly
Australian police officers
Australian politicians of Italian descent
21st-century Australian politicians